Cynthia Brimhall (born March 10, 1964) is an American model and B-movie actress. She was chosen as Playboy's Playmate of the Month for October 1985.

Career
Brimhall went on to perform in six films by Andy Sidaris as nightclub singer and secret agent Edy Stark and appeared on The Price Is Right as one of Barker's Beauties. Brimhall starred in "Skintight" at Harrah's in Las Vegas from August 2000 to September 2001. She worked with Gene Simmons in KISS: eXposed (1987) and starred with Dwight Yoakam in the "I'd Kill to Direct" episode of the CBS TV series P.S. I Love U.

Filmography

Actress
 High Roller: The Stu Ungar Story (2003)
 Fit to Kill (1993)
 Every Breath (1993)
 Hard Hunted (1992)
 Do or Die (1991)
 Guns (1990)
 Picasso Trigger (1988)
 Hard Ticket to Hawaii (1987)

Herself
 Playboy Playmate DVD Calendar Collection: The '90s (2004)
 Playboy: Red Hot Redheads (2001)
 Playboy: Playmates Revisited (1998)
 The Price Is Right (1993–94)
 Playboy: Playmates at Play (1990)
 Playboy: Sexy Lingerie (1988)
 Playboy Video Playmate Calendar 1987 (1986)

See also
 List of people in Playboy 1980–1989

Notes

External links
 
 
 Playboyplus.com Gallery
 

1964 births
Living people
20th-century American actresses
21st-century American actresses
1980s Playboy Playmates
People from Ogden, Utah